Medusa is a mountain at the border of Argentina and Chile. It's located at Catamarca Province, Tinogasta Department, at the Puna de Atacama. At the Chilean side, its shares territories with the commune of Copiapó.

First Ascent 

Medusa was first climbed by Claudio Bravo (Argentina) January 22nd 1986.

Elevation 
Other data from available digital elevation models: SRTM yields 6119 metres, ASTER 6101 metres, and TanDEM-X 6163 metres. The height of the nearest key col is 5605 meters, leading to a topographic prominence of 525 meters. Medusa is considered a Mountain according to the Dominance System  and its dominance is 8.56%. Its parent peak is Ojos del Salado and the Topographic isolation is 5.9 kilometers.

References

External links 

 Elevation information about Medusa
 Weather Forecast at Medusa

Six-thousanders of the Andes
Mountains of Argentina
Mountains of Chile